The Ferlo Nord Wildlife Reserve, established in 1971, is a  IUCN habitat and species protected nature reserve located in Senegal.  The nature reserve is bordered by the Ferlo Sud Wildlife Reserve to the south.

References

Protected areas of Senegal
Protected areas established in 1971